Look Around is the third studio album by Sérgio Mendes and Brasil '66. It was released in 1967. Following this album, Mendes dismissed the musicians and singer Janis Hansen and brought in Karen Phillip to sing with holdover Lani Hall.

Songs
Mendes and Brasil 66 performed the Oscar-nominated Burt Bacharach/Hal David song "The Look of Love", one of their biggest hits, on the Academy Awards telecast in March 1968. The album was recorded at the Sunset Sound, Western Recorders, and Annex Studios, Hollywood. Brasil '66's version of "The Look of Love" quickly shot into the top 10, eclipsing Dusty Springfield's version.

"Like a Lover", an English-language version of "O Cantador", was covered by Carmen McRae, Sarah Vaughan, Helen Merrill, Dianne Reeves, Al Jarreau, Natalie Cole, Jane Monheit, and Kimiko Itoh. "So Many Stars" was recorded by Helen Merrill, Tony Bennett, Sarah Vaughan, Jane Monheit, Barbra Streisand, Natalie Cole, and Stacey Kent

"Tristeza" was an instrumental by Lobo and Nitinho and the title track of Baden Powell's Tristeza on Guitar album (1966). It was  sung by Astrud Gilberto with lyrics by A. Testa on her Italian language album (1968).

Reissue
A remastered version of the album was released on CD in 2000.

Track listing
"With a Little Help from My Friends" (John Lennon, Paul McCartney)
"Roda" (Gilberto Gil, João Augusto)
"Like a Lover" (Dorival Caymmi, Nelson Motta, Alan Bergman, Marilyn Bergman)
"The Frog (A Rã)" (João Donato)
"Tristeza (Goodbye Sadness)" (Harold Lobo-Niltinho)
"The Look of Love" (Burt Bacharach, Hal David)
"Pra Dizer Adeus (To Say Goodbye)" (Edu Lobo, Torquato Neto, Lani Hall)
"Batucada (The Beat)" (Marcos Valle, Paulo Sérgio Valle)
"So Many Stars" (Mendes, Bergman, Bergman)
"Look Around"  (Mendes, Bergman, Bergman)

Personnel
Sérgio Mendes – organ, piano, arranger
John Pisano – guitar
Bob Matthews – bass, vocals
João Palma – drums
José Soares – percussion, vocals
Lani Hall – vocals
Janis Hansen – vocals
Dave Grusin – arranger, orchestration
Dick Hazard  – arranger, orchestration

Charts

Certifications

References 

1967 albums
A&M Records albums
Albums conducted by Dave Grusin
Albums conducted by Richard Hazard
Albums arranged by Dave Grusin
Albums arranged by Richard Hazard
Albums arranged by Sérgio Mendes
Albums produced by Herb Alpert
Albums produced by Jerry Moss
Albums recorded at Sunset Sound Recorders
Albums recorded at United Western Recorders
Sérgio Mendes albums